Apophyga is a genus of moths in the family Geometridae.

Species
 Apophyga altapona Holloway, 1976
 Apophyga apona (Prout, 1932)
 Apophyga griseiplaga Warren
 Apophyga sericea Warren, 1893

References
 Apophyga at Markku Savela's Lepidoptera and Some Other Life Forms

Boarmiini
Geometridae genera